The Paraíba State University (UEPB) is a public university in the Brazilian state of Paraíba. The university has eight campuses throughout the state, and its main campus is located in the city of Campina Grande.

It was founded by local ordinance n. 23, on March 15, 1966, as Regional University of Northeastern Brazil (Portuguese: Universidade Regional do Nordeste - URNe) as a local autarky. On October 11, 1987 by State Law n. 4.977, which was sanctioned by Governor Tarcísio Burity, the URNe became the State University of Paraíba.

Campuses and subjects
The UEPB has eight campuses throughout the state, which houses 48 subjects.

Campus I
It is located in the city of Campina Grande. The campus was named after the economist Edvaldo de Souza do Ó, one of the founders of the university. On July, 1966, Edvaldo do Ó was first elected vice-rector and was later rector of the Universidade Regional do Nordeste, which eventually became the UEPB, until April 10, 1969. The campus I houses the administrative center of the University.

Photo gallery

References

External links 

 Site

State universities in Brazil
Educational institutions established in 1966
1966 establishments in Brazil
Education in Paraíba